The Alliance Against Counterfeit Spirits (“AACS”) represents the world’s major international spirits producing companies. AACS has been in operation since 1993 with one single purpose -  to combat the counterfeiting of distilled spirits brands.

The actions of counterfeiters pose a direct health risk to consumers, erode legitimate tax revenues and undermine consumer trust in well established brands.

The AACS is active in more than 20 countries and protects the brands of some of the largest spirits businesses in the world

History
Spirits are alcoholic drinks that include distilled alcohol, such as gin, liqueurs, vodka, rum, whisky, and brandy. They are high value products. Counterfeit products are sold by subterfuge by re-filling branded spirits bottles.

The AACS was set up to combat the counterfeiting of spirits around the world, which is a big industry.

Structure
It is situated on Holborn Viaduct (A40) in the City of London near City Thameslink railway station.

Partners
AACS partners own over two-thirds of the internationally-recognised spirits brands sold around the world. There are 6 AACS partners: 

 Pernod Ricard
 Brown-Forman
 Diageo
 Bacardi
 William Grant & Sons
 Tito's Vodka

Partner companies produce around 300 million cases of spirits per year - around a third of the worldwide total.

Function
AACS has been in operation since 1993 with one single purpose -  to combat the counterfeiting of distilled spirits brands.

See also
 European Spirits Organisation

References

External links
 AACS

Alcohol industry trade associations
Anti-counterfeiting
Food industry trade groups based in the United Kingdom
International organisations based in London
Organisations based in the City of London
Organizations established in 1993